Dual analog may refer to:
Dual analog control of video games
The Dual Analog Controller released by Sony for the PlayStation
Channel bonding, a computer networking arrangement